The BCS (Hong Kong Section) is an organization of Information Technologists.  It was founded in 1991 to create a platform to unite and communicate with its members in Hong Kong, and to create a professional presence for the BCS Headquarters. The Parent body BCS is the industry body for IT professionals and a Chartered Institute for Information Technology. Throughout the years, the Hong Kong Section has organized many activities for the members and also actively participated in both public and invited consultation of IT related matters initiated by the Government in Hong Kong. Currently, there are about 1,000 members attached to the Section.

Affiliations
 BCS, The Chartered Institute of IT

External links

Introduction of Hong Kong Section by BCS
Hong Kong ICT Awards 2009 Best Professional Development Award (Organised by BCS (Hong Kong Section))

Notes

British Computer Society
Professional associations based in Hong Kong
1991 establishments in Hong Kong